Thermoanaerobacter siderophilus is a dissimilatory Fe(III)-reducing, anaerobic, thermophilic bacterium that was firstly isolated from the sediment of a hydrothermal vent found near the Karymsky volcano, in the Kamchatka peninsula, Russia. It is spore-forming, with type strain SR4T (= DSM 12299T).

References

Further reading

External links
LPSN

Type strain of Thermoanaerobacter siderophilus at BacDive -  the Bacterial Diversity Metadatabase

Thermoanaerobacterales
Thermophiles
Anaerobes
Bacteria described in 1999